Gig is a live album by American hardcore punk band Circle Jerks, recorded in the late 1980s and released by Relativity Records in 1992.

Release and reception
The album was recorded in Los Angeles and Tijuana.

In an AllMusic review, Paul Henderson wrote: "Gig proves yet again that punk rock is meant to be experienced live, and if you missed the Jerks in their heyday, this is the next best thing."

Trouser Press wrote: "Sure it’s fifteen years too late, but the quartet plays ’em like it means ’em, and the hot sound (courtesy producer Paul du Gré) does justice to the spirited performances."

Track listing
"Beat Me Senseless" – 2:07
"High Price on Our Heads" – 2:19
"Letter Bomb" – 1:05
"In Your Eyes" – 0:43
"Making the Bombs" – 3:26
"All Wound Up" – 1:38
"Coup d'Etat" – 1:51
"Mrs. Jones" – 1:51
"Back Against the Wall" – 1:47
"Casualty Vampires" – 2:20
"I Don't" – 2:06
"Making Time" (Creation cover) – 2:23
"Junk Mail" – 1:02
"I, I & I" – 2:08
"World Up My Ass" – 1:15
"I Just Want Some Skank" – 1:13
"Beverly Hills" – 1:02
"The Crowd" – 1:30
"When the Shit Hits the Fan" – 2:33
"Deny Everything" – 0:36
"Wonderful" – 2:32
"Wild in the Streets" – 2:58

Personnel
 Keith Morris – lead vocals
 Greg Hetson – guitar
 Zander Schloss – bass
 Keith Clark – drums
 Paul du Gré – producer, mixing
 Carlo Nuccio – mixing
 Eddy Schreyer – mastering
 Michael Webster – digital editing
 David Bett – art direction
 Brian Freeman – design

References

Circle Jerks albums
1992 live albums